|}

The Rose of Lancaster Stakes is a Group 3 flat horse race in Great Britain open to horses aged three years or older. It is run at Haydock Park over a distance of 1 mile, 2 furlongs and 100 yards (2,103 metres), and it is scheduled to take place each year in early August.

History
The event was established in 1986, and it was initially called the Summer Trophy. It was given its current title and promoted from Listed to Group 3 status in 1989. For a period it was sponsored by Burtonwood Brewery, and it was later backed by the property development firm Petros. The Tote began sponsoring the event in 2007.

The Rose of Lancaster Stakes was formerly contested over 1 mile, 2 furlongs and 120 yards. It was cut to its present distance in 2009. The sponsorship of the race was adopted by Betfred when the company bought the Tote in 2011, and in 2012 it was sponsored by Victor Chandler International. Betfred took over the sponsorship again from 2013 to 2017.

Records
Most successful horse:
 no horse has won this race more than once

Leading jockey (3 wins):
 Richard Hills – Fahal (1995), Ekraar (2000), Nayef (2001)
 Joe Fanning - Mister Monet (2004), Amralah (2014), Frankuus (2017)

Leading trainer (3 wins):
 Sir Michael Stoute – Greek Dance (1999), Notable Guest (2005), Class Is Class (2011)
 Marcus Tregoning – Ekraar (2000), Nayef (2001), Mulaqat (2006)
 Mark Johnston - Mister Monet (2004), Jukebox Jury (2009), Frankuus (2017)

Winners

See also
 Horse racing in Great Britain
 List of British flat horse races

References
 Racing Post:
 galopp-sieger.de – Rose of Lancaster Stakes.
 horseracingintfed.com – International Federation of Horseracing Authorities – Rose of Lancaster Stakes (2019).
 pedigreequery.com – Rose of Lancaster Stakes – Haydock.
 

Flat races in Great Britain
Haydock Park Racecourse
Open middle distance horse races
Recurring sporting events established in 1986
1986 establishments in England